Itziar Pinillos Moreno (born 21 September 2000) is a Spanish professional footballer who plays as a midfielder for Liga F club Madrid CFF.

Club career
Pinillos started her career at Atlético Madrid.

References

External links
Profile at La Liga

2000 births
Living people
Women's association football midfielders
Spanish women's footballers
Footballers from Madrid
Atlético Madrid Femenino players
Madrid CFF players
Primera División (women) players
Spain women's youth international footballers